Jinding Street Subdistrict is a subdistrict within the northwestern part of Shijingshan District, Beijing, China. It shares border with Wulituo Subdistrict in the north, Pingguoyuan Subdistrict in the east, Gucheng Subdistrict in the south, and Guangning Subdistrict in the west. The population of the subdistrict was 67,734 as of 2020.

History 
The subdistrict was first created in 1954. In August 1958, it was reformed into Jinding Street Reisidents' Production Team, before reinstated as a subdistrict in 1963.

Administrative Divisions 
In 2021, the following 15 communities constitutes Jinding Street Subdistrict:

Landmark 
 Fahai Temple

See also 
 List of township-level divisions of Beijing

References 

Shijingshan District
Subdistricts of Beijing